The Efutu (also called Awutu or Simpafo) are an Akanized Guang people that are the original inhabitants of present-day Ghana. They founded the coastal area about 1390 C.E.  The Efutu are found in Awutu, Adina, Senya-Beraku and Winneba (originally called Simpa) and their main occupation is fishing. Like most Guans, they were somewhat absorbed into the greater Akan culture and adopted Akan names via annexing and military campaigns as the Akan were natural warriors. Similar to the Akuapem people of the Eastern Region of Ghana who are ruled by an Akan Abusua (called the Asona clan) but was originally ruled by their own Guan kings. They also have adopted (with modifications) the Fante version of some Akan institutions and the use of some Fante words in their rituals. Before Akanization, the Simpa Kingdom was formed about 1400 AD.

The famous king of the Efutus is Omanhene Nana Kwasi Gyan Ghartey I (1666-1712, the 1st to bear the Akan Omanhene title). He was famous for his fishing activities, had as many as 12 wives, and had more than six children with each wife. He helped to develop the town and its people by building various structures, including the police station, the secondary school, and all the major huge buildings in the town.

The Efutu speak Efutu

Communities 
The people of Efutu are patrilineal. The male line of the siblings and sons are called the Prama (male family houses in which meetings are held). In Winneba each male siblings or sons has a fetish from which it derive its name.

A typical native of Efutu must hail from one of the original paternal houses (Prama). It has about sixteen rural communities which most of them established as a result of farming. They include: Ekoroful, Ansaful, Ateitu, Gyatakrom, Dawuro Prama, Saakoodo, Nsuekyire, Gyahadze, Gyangyanadze, Sankoro, Tuansa, Kojo Beedu, Atekyedo, Osubonpanyin, New Winneba, New Ateitu.

Akumesi and Aboakyer festivals

The Efutu celebrate the Akumesi Festival (with the exception of Winneba which celebrates the Aboakyir Festival). The Akumesi Festival, which is similar to the Homowo of the Ga-Adangmes, is celebrated to hoot at hunger.

The Aboakyer festival is a bushbuck hunting festival celebrated by the people of Winneba in the Central Region of Ghana. The name Aboakyer translates as ‘hunting for game or animal’ in Fante dialect as spoken by the people of the Central region. The institution of the festival was to commemorate the migration of the Simpafo( the aboriginal name of the people of Winneba). The people believed that a god, who they called Penkye Otu, had protected them from all dangers during their migration and to show their appreciation, the people consulted the custodian of the god, a traditional priest who acted as an intermediary between the people and the god, to ask the god for its preferred sacrifice. To their astonishment, the god asked for a human sacrifice, someone from the royal family. This sacrifice went on for some years but was later stopped as the people were no longer interested in human sacrifices. A request was made to the god to change the sacrifice type, as they believed that sacrificing royalty could eventually wipe out the royal family. The god in return asked for leopard  to be caught alive and presented to it at its shrine. After the presentation, it was to be beheaded as a sacrifice. This was to be done annually in a festival. So many people were hurt during the leopard hunt/ live capture that it was later changed to bushbuck hunting.

Game Hunting

The game hunting begins with two Asafo Companies, Tuafo 1 and Dentsefo 2. A week to the aboakyer festival both the Tuafo 1 and the Dentsefo 2 outdoor their gods.On Tuesday the two Asafo company will parade at the seashore for canon race to compete among themselves.On friday a day to the game  the two main ansafo groups that's tuafo1 and dentsifo 2 will parade their gods.On saturday the day for the game the two asafo company will dress to the forest to hunt for the bushbuck. The paramount chief and his sub chiefs will then move to the durbar  grounds to wait for the first asafo group to bring the bushbuck antelope.

References

Sources
Meyerowitz, Eva L. R.  "A Note on the Origins of Ghana."  African Affairs 51.205 (1952): 319-23.

Akan
Akan people
Ethnic groups in Ghana